National Highway 353E, commonly called NH 353E is a national highway in  India. It is a spur road of National Highway 53. NH-353E traverses the state of Maharashtra in India.

Route 
Umred, Bhisi, Chimur, Anandwan, Warora.

Junctions  
 
  Terminal near Umred.
  Terminal near Warora.

See also 
 List of National Highways in India
 List of National Highways in India by State

References

External links 
NH 353E on OpenStreetMap

National highways in India
National Highways in Maharashtra